The Cathedral of Our Lady of the Assumption, often called Port-au-Prince Cathedral, was a cathedral in Port-au-Prince, Haiti. The cathedral was destroyed in the 12 January 2010 earthquake.

Before its destruction, the cupola of the north tower of the Cathedral served as the front lighthouse of a pair guiding mariners into Port-au-Prince harbor.

Destruction

The roof and the towers flanking the main entrance collapsed in the 12 January 2010 earthquake, although the lower parts of the walls remain standing.  The earthquake also destroyed the nunciature and the archdiocesan offices, killing Archbishop Joseph Serge Miot instantly and Vicar General Charles Benoit later.

Reconstruction
In March 2012, the Archdiocese of Port-au-Prince, in collaboration with Faith & Form magazine and the Institute for the Safeguarding of National Heritage (ISPAN), a Haitian-government institution, launched an international design competition inviting the architects from all over the world to submit ideas that would inform the reconstruction of the cathedral.

Puerto Rican architect Segundo Cardona, FAIA from SCF Architects won the competition. He proposed to integrate and frame the facade of the old building, which survived the earthquake, with two new concrete towers, while the old nave, whose pillars also partially survived, will be transformed into a covered courtyard. The religious ceremonies will take place at the level of the current transept under a vast room surmounted by a dome, underneath which will be the altar. The new design allows for a capacity of 1,200 faithful (capacity which can be raised to 600 additional persons thanks to the use of the covered yard). The interior of the new cathedral will be marked by the creative and abundant use of natural light, as the supply of electricity in Port-au-Prince is intermittent and expensive.

"The winning design — [is] a modern interpretation of the traditional architecture of a cathedral [...]. Cardona’s other significant works include the Coliseum of San Juan and the Puerto Rico Pavilion built for the 1992 World Expo in Seville, Spain."

The building remains in ruins as of 2021.

See also
List of cathedrals in Haiti

References

External links

The Construction and the Deterioration of a National Treasure: Port-au-Prince Cathedral
Image of the destroyed cathedral

20th-century Roman Catholic church buildings in Haiti
Buildings and structures in Port-au-Prince
Roman Catholic cathedrals in Haiti
2010 disestablishments in Haiti
Destroyed churches
Roman Catholic churches completed in 1914
Buildings and structures demolished in 2010
1914 establishments in Haiti